Kiski Area High School is a public high school in Leechburg, Pennsylvania. Kiski Area is the only high school in the Kiski Area School District which serves eight municipalities in Westmoreland County and one municipality in Armstrong County.

History
Kiski Area High School was established in 1962.

Athletics
The following sports are offered at Kiski:

 Baseball
 Basketball
 Bowling
 Cross country
 Football
 Golf
 Ice hockey
 Soccer
 Softball
 Swimming
 Tennis
 Track and field
 Volleyball
 Wrestling

Cold War 
The school had a Nuclear Fallout Shelter at its B Gym on the opposite side of the tennis courts.

References

External links
 

Schools in Westmoreland County, Pennsylvania
Public high schools in Pennsylvania